Pattambi is a town taluk and municipality in the Palakkad district of the state of Kerala, India. It is also the administrative headquarters of the Pattambi Taluk. Pattambi is located along the banks of Bharathappuzha river. A Mini Civil Station also functions here to provide government related services.

The town has made important cultural contributions. Pattambi was once the principal seat of Sanskrit learning, and produced many eminent scholars and literary figures. Regional Agricultural Research Station, Pattambi is one of the Agricultural research institute in Kerala. Sree Neelakanta Government Sanskrit College Pattambi was established in the year 1899.
Agricultural research station in Kerala

History
This place was originally a part of the Nedunganad Swaroopam dynasty, which was ruled by Nedungadis, who sway over a large part of present-day Pattambi and Ottapalam Taluks. By the end of the 15th century CE, Nedunganad came under the leadership of the Zamorin of Calicut, who was also the main ruler of South Malabar region. The Zamorin appointed his local chieftain at Kavalappara Kovilakam to rule this area. It was a part of Walluvanad Taluk in Malappuram Revenue Division of Malabar District during British Raj, and later became part of Ottapalam taluk and now Pattambi is the headquarters of Pattambi Taluk formed on 23 December 2013.

Demographics

As of 2011 census of India total population of Pattambi Village Panchayat is 28,632.
 14,049 males (49%); 14,583 females (51%).
 No of Households:  5,897
 Scheduled Caste population:  3,471 (12%)
 Scheduled Tribe population: 37 (0% ).
 In the age group 0–6 years: 3,534 (males: 1,837, females: 1,697)
 Literacy: 83% (23,888 literates and 4,744 illiterates)
 Of the total population 8,561 (30%) are employed. It includes 1,657 people with irregular employment.

Education
Sree Neelakanta Government Sanskrit College Pattambi 
Le-Ment College Of Advanced Studies
MES Arts & Science College
MES Women's College
Karuna Arts And Science College
MES International School
St. Paul's English Medium High School
GHSS Pattambi
CGM School
GUPS Pattambi
GMLP School Pattambi

Transportation

Road

Pattambi is served by Municipal Private bus stand. KSRTC Station Master office is also functioning here.Pattambi is well connected with all major cities in Kerala. State Highway 23 joins State Highway 39 at Pattambi. Palakkad Ponnani road which connects with NH 66 also passes through the town. Pattambi Cherpulassery road connects to State Highway 53 and further to National Highway 966.

Railways

Pattambi is served by Pattambi railway station with 33 halting trains. Shoranur Junction railway station is the nearest major railway station.

Air

Calicut International Airport is the nearest airport (62 km).Cochin International Airport is located about 93 km from Pattambi.

Notable personalities

The following list contains the names of famous people who came from various parts of Pattambi Taluk created in 2013:
E. Sreedharan
Akkitham Achuthan Namboothiri
M. T. Vasudevan Nair
V. T. Bhattathiripad 
C. P. Mohammed
Major Ravi
Savitha Nambrath
Govind Padmasoorya
Anoop Krishnan
Anumol
Manikandan Pattambi
Kalamandalam Gopi
M.G. Sasi
Shivaji (Malayalam actor)
V. T. Balram
Shafi Parambil
Muhammed Muhsin

Pattambi Taluk
Pattambi is the westernmost Taluk of Palakkad district, Pattambi taluk is bounded by Ottapalam Taluk of Palakkad district to the east, Ponnani taluk of Malappuram district to the west, Tirur and Perinthalmanna Taluks of Malappuram district to the north, and Kunnamkulam Taluk of Thrissur district to the south.

See also
Pattambi Taluk
Sree Neelakanta Government Sanskrit College Pattambi
Regional Agricultural Research Station, Pattambi
Pattambi Assembly constituency
Shoranur–Mangalore section

References

Cities and towns in Palakkad district